Wilda may refer to:
Wilda, Poznań, a southern district of the city of Poznań in western Poland
Typhoon Wilda (disambiguation), several typhoons and tropical storms
Wilhelm Eduard Wilda (1800–1856), German jurist

See also